Gordon Obrien Swaby (born 18 November 1990) is an internet entrepreneur based in Kingston, Jamaica. He  is the CEO/Founder of EduFocal Limited an E-Learning web application for students at the CXC and PEP level.

Swaby was also the founder of the now defunct website Advance-Gamers; a large gaming website in the Caribbean at the time.

Swaby is an inductee of the Branson Centre of Entrepreneurship in the Caribbean.

Awards 

Swaby is a Private Sector Organization of Jamaica (PSOJ) Jamaica Gleaner 50underFifty business leader awardee. An award he won in 2012. In 2014, Gordon was named by the Inter-American Development Bank as one of ten innovators in the Latin America and Caribbean Region.

References

External links
 

Jamaican businesspeople
1990 births
Living people